The 2019 season of the Indian Premier League, also known as IPL 12, was the twelfth season of the IPL, a professional Twenty20 cricket league established by the Board of Control for Cricket in India (BCCI) in 2007. At one point other countries were considered to host the tournament, due to the Indian general elections but eventually the tournament was played entirely in India with the season commencing on 23 March. The tagline was Game banayega Name!(Game will make your name!)

India's opening match at the 2019 Cricket World Cup was postponed from 2 to 5 June as the BCCI were directed to maintain a mandatory 15-day gap between the conclusion of IPL and India's subsequent international fixture as per Lodha Committee's recommendation.

Delhi Daredevils were renamed as the Delhi Capitals, the franchise announced on 4 December 2018, and also released a new logo. Chennai Super Kings were the defending champions who won third title .

Mumbai Indians defeated the Chennai Super Kings by 1 run to win the final for their fourth title. David Warner won the Orange Cap for the leading run-scorer of the tournament with 692 runs. Imran Tahir, of Chennai Super Kings, was awarded the Purple Cap for finishing as the leading wicket-taker of the tournament with 26 wickets. Andre Russell of Kolkata Knight Riders was named the Most Valuable Player, and Shubman Gill also of Kolkata Knight Riders was named the Emerging Player of the Tournament.

Personnel changes

The transfers and the retention lists for the season were announced in November 2018. Gautam Gambhir, Yuvraj Singh and Glenn Maxwell were the prominent names among the players being released. Jaydev Unadkat, the costliest Indian player in 2018 auction, was also released. The player auction was held on 18 December 2018 at Jaipur. Jaydev Unadkat and uncapped Varun Chakravarthy were the most expensive player at Rs 8.4 crore. Sam Curran was the most expensive foreign player at Rs 7.2 crore. Prominent players like Cheteshwar Pujara, Brendon McCullum, Mushfiqur Rahim and Alex Hales remained unsold.

Venues

Teams and standings

Points table

("C" refers to the "Champions" of the Tournament. 'R'(Runner-up))

Match summary

League stage 

The full schedule of the 2019 season was published on the IPL website.

Matches

Playoffs

Playoffs 

Qualifier 1

Eliminator

Qualifier 2

Final

Statistics

Most runs 

  David Warner of Sunrisers Hyderabad received the Orange Cap.

Most wickets 

  Imran Tahir of Chennai Super Kings received the Purple Cap.

End of the season awards

 Source:

Betting Controversy
On 14 May 2022, the Central Bureau of Investigation booked three people, one from Delhi and two from Hyderabad in connection with alleged fixing of IPL 2019 matches. The CBI received information that a network of individuals involved in cricket betting were influencing the outcome of IPL based on inputs from Pakistan.

See also
 2019 Women's T20 Challenge

References

External links
 Series home at ESPN Cricinfo

 
Indian Premier League seasons
Indian Premier League